Shaun Hart (born 17 May 1971) is a former Australian rules football player, who played for the Brisbane Bears/Lions in the Australian Football League.  Hart played in Brisbane's Hatrick of premierships from 2001 to 2003 as well as in the clubs reserves premiership in 1991. He is currently the director of coaching at Port Adelaide Power and has also been an assistant coach.

Early life 
He was born in Ferntree Gully, Victoria and moved to country Victoria where he played for the Shepparton United Football Club.

Hart was recruited to the Brisbane Bears from Shepparton in the 1989 national VFL draft.

AFL career 

Shaun Hart played his first senior game in the first match of the 1990 season.

He initially struggled with the demands of professional football and played a great deal of football in reserve grade.  This allowed him to gain a place in the Bears' only premiership side by being eligible to play in the 1991 reserve grade Grand Final.

In 2001 he was awarded his highest individual honour, the Norm Smith Medal, as best on ground in the Lions' first premiership win. He also went on to play important roles in the Lions successful campaigns in 2002 and 2003.

In the 2004 Preliminary Final, with the Lions poised to enter a playoff for a record-equalling fourth consecutive premiership, Hart was unlucky enough to find himself in the path of teammate Daniel Bradshaw on a lead. Bradshaw was unable to avoid a collision and Hart emerged with massive facial injuries. He was immediately taken to hospital, where shocked medical staff commented that his injuries were consistent with being in a car crash at speed without wearing a seat belt.  As a consequence of consistent head injuries, for much of his career, he wore a soft helmet.

Unable to take his place in the Lions side for the 2004 Grand Final, he was forced to watch from his hospital bed as his team failed to maintain a half-time lead over Port Adelaide due to injuries to key forwards Jonathan Brown and Alastair Lynch.  He announced his retirement from football not long afterwards.

Statistics

|-
|- style="background-color: #EAEAEA"
! scope="row" style="text-align:center" | 1990
|style="text-align:center;"|
| 32 || 11 || 2 || 6 || 52 || 43 || 95 || 14 || 14 || 0.2 || 0.5 || 4.7 || 3.9 || 8.6 || 1.3 || 1.3 || 0
|-
! scope="row" style="text-align:center" | 1991
|style="text-align:center;"|
| 32 || 6 || 1 || 1 || 51 || 32 || 83 || 13 || 13 || 0.2 || 0.2 || 8.5 || 5.3 || 13.8 || 2.2 || 2.2 || 0
|- style="background-color: #EAEAEA"
! scope="row" style="text-align:center" | 1992
|style="text-align:center;"|
| 32 || 12 || 1 || 5 || 156 || 90 || 246 || 51 || 24 || 0.1 || 0.4 || 13.0 || 7.5 || 20.5 || 4.3 || 2.0 || 0
|-
! scope="row" style="text-align:center" | 1993
|style="text-align:center;"|
| 32 || 19 || 9 || 4 || 205 || 88 || 293 || 56 || 46 || 0.5 || 0.2 || 10.8 || 4.6 || 15.4 || 2.9 || 2.4 || 0
|- style="background-color: #EAEAEA"
! scope="row" style="text-align:center" | 1994
|style="text-align:center;"|
| 32 || 11 || 11 || 2 || 86 || 41 || 127 || 22 || 15 || 1.0 || 0.2 || 7.8 || 3.7 || 11.5 || 2.0 || 1.4 || 0
|-
! scope="row" style="text-align:center" | 1995
|style="text-align:center;"|
| 32 || 23 || 32 || 21 || 307 || 173 || 480 || 87 || 42 || 1.4 || 0.9 || 13.3 || 7.5 || 20.9 || 3.8 || 1.8 || 1
|- style="background-color: #EAEAEA"
! scope="row" style="text-align:center" | 1996
|style="text-align:center;"|
| 32 || 20 || 25 || 21 || 255 || 115 || 370 || 56 || 59 || 1.3 || 1.1 || 12.8 || 5.8 || 18.5 || 2.8 || 3.0 || 5
|-
! scope="row" style="text-align:center" | 1997
|style="text-align:center;"|
| 32 || 19 || 11 || 15 || 250 || 124 || 374 || 75 || 39 || 0.6 || 0.8 || 13.2 || 6.5 || 19.7 || 3.9 || 2.1 || 7
|- style="background-color: #EAEAEA"
! scope="row" style="text-align:center" | 1998
|style="text-align:center;"|
| 32 || 18 || 12 || 14 || 218 || 151 || 369 || 66 || 40 || 0.7 || 0.8 || 12.1 || 8.4 || 20.5 || 3.7 || 2.2 || 5
|-
! scope="row" style="text-align:center" | 1999
|style="text-align:center;"|
| 32 || 23 || 18 || 7 || 272 || 121 || 393 || 75 || 35 || 0.8 || 0.3 || 11.8 || 5.3 || 17.1 || 3.3 || 1.5 || 6
|- style="background-color: #EAEAEA"
! scope="row" style="text-align:center" | 2000
|style="text-align:center;"|
| 32 || 24 || 14 || 15 || 264 || 142 || 406 || 97 || 52 || 0.6 || 0.6 || 11.0 || 5.9 || 16.9 || 4.0 || 2.2 || 3
|-
| scope=row bgcolor=F0E68C | 2001# || 
| 32 || 19 || 8 || 7 || 195 || 94 || 289 || 62 || 33 || 0.4 || 0.4 || 10.3 || 4.9 || 15.2 || 3.3 || 1.7 || 0
|- style="background-color: #EAEAEA"
| scope=row bgcolor=F0E68C | 2002# || 
| 32 || 23 || 8 || 3 || 178 || 108 || 286 || 77 || 57 || 0.3 || 0.1 || 7.7 || 4.7 || 12.4 || 3.3 || 2.5 || 0
|-
| scope=row bgcolor=F0E68C | 2003# || 
| 32 || 25 || 18 || 13 || 290 || 126 || 416 || 104 || 60 || 0.7 || 0.5 || 11.6 || 5.0 || 16.6 || 4.2 || 2.4 || 5
|- style="background-color: #EAEAEA"
! scope="row" style="text-align:center" | 2004
|style="text-align:center;"|
| 32 || 20 || 7 || 6 || 182 || 113 || 295 || 46 || 41 || 0.4 || 0.3 || 9.1 || 5.7 || 14.8 || 2.3 || 2.1 || 0
|- class="sortbottom"
! colspan=3| Career
! 273
! 177
! 140
! 2961
! 1561
! 4522
! 901
! 570
! 0.6
! 0.5
! 10.8
! 5.7
! 16.6
! 3.3
! 2.1
! 32
|}

Honours and achievements
Team
 3× AFL premiership player: 2001, 2002, 2003
 AFL Reserves premiership player: 1991

Individual
 Norm Smith Medal: 2001
 State of Origin (Victoria): 1998
 Brisbane Lions Team of the Decade 1997–2006 – Rover
 Inaugural Brisbane Lions AFL team – Wing

Post playing career 
Not long after retiring, Hart supported the newly formed, Christian-aligned Family First Party in 2004 Federal election to the Australian House of Representatives. In 2007 he stood as a Family First candidate in Queensland for the Senate at the 2007 Australian federal election, although he was unsuccessful.

In 2008, Hart was appointed the senior coach of the Broadbeach football club in Queensland.

Hart held a number of coaching and development roles at the Gold Coast Football Club from 2009 until January 2014 and then joined Port Adelaide as Director of Coaching in January 2014.

References

External links
 Brisbane Lions Shaun Hart information page
 "Christian speaks out as he takes leave of Lions" Melbourne Age 1 October 2004, retrieved 15 December 2005
 "Surviving in the Lions Den" Sydney Anglicans 25/7/2003 retrieved 15 December 2005

Australian evangelicals
1971 births
Living people
Australian rules footballers from Victoria (Australia)
Brisbane Bears players
Brisbane Lions players
Brisbane Lions Premiership players
Norm Smith Medal winners
Shepparton United Football Club players
Australian Christians
Victorian State of Origin players
Three-time VFL/AFL Premiership players
People from Ferntree Gully, Victoria